Silistra Knoll rises to over  in southern Levski Ridge, in the Tangra Mountains of Livingston Island in the South Shetland Islands, Antarctica. It is bounded by Macy Glacier to the north and Boyana Glacier to the south.

Location

Maps
 L.L. Ivanov et al. Antarctica: Livingston Island and Greenwich Island, South Shetland Islands. Scale 1:100000 topographic map. Sofia: Antarctic Place-names Commission of Bulgaria, 2005.
 L.L. Ivanov. Antarctica: Livingston Island and Greenwich, Robert, Snow and Smith Islands. Scale 1:120000 topographic map.  Troyan: Manfred Wörner Foundation, 2009.

References
Silistra Knoll. SCAR Composite Antarctic Gazetteer
 Bulgarian Antarctic Gazetteer. Antarctic Place-names Commission. (details in Bulgarian, basic data in English)

External links
 Silistra Knoll. Copernix satellite image

Tangra Mountains
Silistra